Activation key may refer to:

Product activation
Product key
Volume license key
Key changer (software)